Tamilology, a subset of the larger field of Dravidian studies, denotes study of the Tamil language, Tamil literature and the culture of the Tamil people

Definition
The term denotes the process of examining the study and contributions  of Tamil language, Tamil literature and lifestyles of the native Tamil people. And here the term lifestyles covers a vast spectrum of the day-to-day activities of the native Tamil people as can be gleaned from their indigenous literature of all kinds, including grammatical, lexical, epic, lyrical, dramatic, theological, medical, philosophical, moral, jurisprudence and folk literature, containing data about their various rites and rituals, customs and manners, legends and fables, diseases and medicines, literature and education, society and culture, from time immemorial until now.

References

Tamil culture
Dravidian studies